Steven Black (born 17 June 1992) is a Scottish professional footballer who plays as a centre-back for Dalbeattie Star.

Early life
Black was born in Dumfries, and attended Annan Academy as a pupil in Dumfries and Galloway.

Career

Club career
Black joined Queen of the South's youth set-up at eleven years old. After progressing through the youth set-up, Black signed a modern apprenticeship contract in May 2009, having already represented his country at schoolboy level.

In 2010, Black was on loaned out to Gretna 2008 and during his loan spell he even played in goal versus Hawick Royal Albert, due to an injury to the keeper and all substitutes were already utilised.

On 26 March 2011, Black debuted for the Doonhamers first-team in a 4–1 home league win versus Stirling Albion as an 83rd-minute substitute. On 26 April 2011, Black started his first match for Queens a month later versus Ross County alongside David Lilley in central defence in a 1–0 defeat. Black won the under-19's Players' Player of the season award in June 2011.

On 4 March 2013, Black was loaned out to Annan Athletic for one month. On 22 June 2013, Black returned to the Black and Golds, this time on a permanent deal. Black then spent four seasons with the Galabankies before signing for Lowland League club Gretna 2008 in June 2017, after previously being out on loan at Raydale Park whilst being a Queen of the South player.

On 14 February 2020, Black signed for  Lowland League club Dalbeattie Star.

International career
Black was selected for the Scotland international schools squad in January 2011 for the Schools Centenary Internationals. Black played for Scotland's under-18 national team on four occasions versus Northern Ireland, England, Australia and Wales.

Honours
Queen of the South
Scottish Challenge Cup: 2012–13

References

External links
 listed as Stephen Black, stats for Queen of the South & Annan (loan)
 stats for Annan

1992 births
Living people
Footballers from Dumfries
Scottish footballers
Scotland youth international footballers
Association football central defenders
Queen of the South F.C. players
Annan Athletic F.C. players
Gretna F.C. 2008 players
Scottish Football League players
People educated at Annan Academy
Scottish Professional Football League players
Lowland Football League players